The First Echelon  (translit. Pervyy eshelon) is a 1955 Soviet film directed by Mikhail Kalatozov, for which Dimitri Shostakovich wrote the music. A touching romance between the Secretary of the Komsomol organization Alexey Uzorov and tractor driver Anna Zalogina on the background of Virgin Lands Campaign in Kazakhstan.

Cast
 Vsevolod Sanayev as Alexey  Yegorovich Dontsov, state farm director
 Nikolay Annenkov as Kashtanov, secretary of the RC
 Oleg Yefremov as Alexey Uzorov
 Izolda Izvitskaya as Anna Zalogina
 Nina Doroshina as Nelly Panina
 Vyacheslav Voronin as Troyan
 Khoren Abrahamyan as Varten Vartanyan
 Tatiana Doronina as Zoya

References

External links
 
 Review by Karl J. Kipling]
 [https://books.google.com/books?id=ti0aXbGZPS8C&dq=The+First+Echelon+kalatozov&pg=PT265 The Cambridge Companion to Shostakovich

1955 films
Films directed by Mikhail Kalatozov
Films scored by Dmitri Shostakovich
1955 drama films
Soviet drama films
Mosfilm films
1950s Russian-language films